The 2013 FIS Ski Jumping Grand Prix was the 20th Summer Grand Prix season in ski jumping on plastic for men and the 2nd for ladies.

Season began on 26 July 2013 in Hinterzarten, Germany and ends on 3 October 2013 in Klingenthal, Germany.

For men Andreas Wellinger was the overall and team of Germany was the Nations Cup winner.

For ladies Sara Takanashi was the overall and team of Japan was the Nations Cup winner.

Other competitive circuits this season included the World Cup, Continental Cup and Alpen Cup.

Calendar

Men

Ladies

Mixed

Men's team

Men's standings

Individual

Nations Cup

Ladies' standings

Individual

Nations Cup

References

Grand Prix
FIS Grand Prix Ski Jumping